Embrico of Mainz (Embricho Moguntinus) is the author of the Vita Mahumeti, a Latin biography of Muhammad.
It was modelled on the verse hagiography of contemporaries such as Hildebert of Le Mans.  It was most likely written between 1072 and 1090. The author of the Vita has been identified with the future provost of Mainz Cathedral, Embricho II.

Embrico's text is roughly contemporary with the Dei gesta per Francos by Guibert of Nogent. Both texts  are in the tradition of the Chronographia of Theophanes the Confessor, including the account of Muhammad's epilepsy and his body being eaten by pigs after his death.

References

Further reading
John Tolan, "Anti-Hagiography: Embrico of Mainz's Vita Mahumeti,"  Journal of Medieval History 22 (1996), 25-41.

External links
Translation of Embrico of Mainz's Vita Mahumeti by Aymenn Jawad Al-Tamimi 

12th-century scholars
12th-century Latin writers
Religious biographers